Razzmatazz or Razzamatazz may refer to:

Film and TV
 Razzmatazz (U.S. TV series), a 1970s/1980s young-teenagers' show hosted by Brian Tochi
 Razzmatazz (Indian TV series), an Indian dance reality show since 2001
 Razzmatazz (British TV series), a UK-based 1980s children's show

Music

 "Razzamatazz", a song performend by John Travolta in 1977
 "Razzamatazz", a 1981 song from the Quincy Jones album The Dude
 "Razzmatazz Intro.", a song by Toy Dolls as the theme tune in several series of the British TV show Razzmatazz. Contained in Toy Dolls' 1985 album A Far Out Disc
 "Razzmatazz" (song), song by Pulp, 1993
 Razmataz, a 2000 jazz album, book and animation DVD by Paolo Conte
 Razzmatazz, a 2020 album and song by I Dont Know How But They Found Me

Books
 Razzmatazz, a 2022 Novel by Christopher Moore

Brands
 Razzmatazz (color), a Crayola crayon color, a shade of rose, or crimson
 A raspberry-flavored liqueur made by DeKuyper
 A berry-flavored smoothie made by Jamba Juice
 MV Razzmatazz, a 1960 built cruise ship

Places 
 Razzmatazz (club), club and music hall in Barcelona

See also
 Erasmatazz, the website of game designer Chris Crawford